Averasboro Battlefield Historic District is a national historic district located near Erwin, Harnett County, North Carolina. It encompasses four contributing buildings, three contributing sites, three contributing structures, and one contributing object on the battlefield associated with the American Civil War Battle of Averasboro of March 15–16, 1865. They include the separately listed Oak Grove and Lebanon plantations, along with a Commemorative Marker (1872), Chicora Cemetery and over 4,000 acres of rural agricultural land.

It was listed on the National Register of Historic Places in 2001.

The American Battlefield Trust and its partners have acquired and preserved  of the Averasboro battlefield.

References

American Civil War battlefields
Historic districts on the National Register of Historic Places in North Carolina
Buildings and structures in Harnett County, North Carolina
National Register of Historic Places in Harnett County, North Carolina